The Teen Choice Awards were an annual awards show that aired on the Fox television network. The awards honored the year's biggest achievements in music, film, sports, television, fashion, social media, and more, voted by viewers living in the United States, aged 13 and over, through various social media sites; primarily Instagram, Twitter, Snapchat, and YouTube.

Following the 2019 ceremony, the Teen Choice Awards has been on an indefinite hiatus for unknown reasons.

History
Executive producers, Bob Bain and Michael Burg, came together to create an award show geared toward a teen demographic, somewhat older than that of the Nickelodeon Kids' Choice Awards, but similar to that of MTV. The format of the show has remained the same over the years, awarding the achievements of those in the entertainment and athletic industries with non-traditional categories fixed into the ceremony.

Ballots were once used in teen-oriented magazines, where readers were to purchase and tear out their ballot. Votes could also be cast online through Fox.com. In 2008, Fox and the show's producers created Teenchoiceawards.com as the official website for the Teen Choice Awards. In 2009, the number of votes cast was in excess of 83 million. Votes are now cast online through Twitter, FOX.com, and the FOX NOW app. In 2016, more than 37 million votes were cast.

Since the ceremony's inception, the show has given out genuine custom-made surfboards to individual winners. The surfboard was chosen as the award because it represents the freedom of the summer vacation for teens. Some celebrities, such as Jennifer Love Hewitt, have actually used them to surf; Marlon Wayans famously said, "Brothers don't surf"; and in 2009, Hugh Jackman, upon winning his first one, said that he was no longer the only Australian without a surfboard. Each of the custom-made surfboard awards costs $800 to make.

Ceremonies

Venues 
The show was held at the Barker Hangar at Santa Monica Airport for its first two shows in 1999 and 2000. From 2001 to 2013, it was held at the Universal Amphitheatre (later known as Gibson Amphitheatre) in Universal City, California. With the demolition of the amphitheater in 2013, the show moved to a new location. Then after the remodeled Pauley Pavilion at UCLA in Westwood, Los Angeles was flooded by a broken 30" water pipe on July 29, 2014, the show was moved to the Shrine Auditorium in Los Angeles. The 2015 and 2017 ceremonies were held at The Galen Center (USC), and the 2016 and 2018 ceremonies were held at the refurbished Forum in Inglewood. The 2019 ceremony was held at an outdoor set in Hermosa Beach, California.

Special awards

Extraordinary Achievement

 2000: Serena Williams and Venus Williams
 2001: Sarah Michelle Gellar
 2002: Reese Witherspoon

Courage Award

 2004: Bethany Hamilton
 2006: Jason McElwain

Ultimate Choice Award

 2004: Mike Myers
 2007: Justin Timberlake
 2009: Britney Spears
 2011: Taylor Swift
 2012: The Twilight Saga
 2013: Ashton Kutcher
 2014: Selena Gomez
 2017: Miley Cyrus

Visionary Award

 2005: Gwen Stefani
 2017: Bruno Mars

Acuvue Inspire Award

 2011: Demi Lovato
 2012: Miranda Cosgrove
 2013: Nick Jonas

Candie's Style Icon
 2013: Miley Cyrus
 2014: Zendaya

 2015: Britney Spears

Decade Award
 2016: Justin Timberlake
 2017: Maroon 5
 2019: Jonas Brothers

See Her
 2017: Vanessa Hudgens

Icon Award
 2019: Taylor Swift

Note: Special Awards are not given every year.

Most wins
The following artists have won 10 or more awards.

Records

Wins
 Most wins overall – One Direction – 28
 Most wins by an individual – Taylor Swift – 26
 Oldest winner – Betty White – 88 years, 203 days (Choice Movie Dance)
 Youngest winner – Rosie McClelland – 5 years, 319 days (Choice Web Star)
 Most wins by a television series – Pretty Little Liars – 38
 Most consecutive wins in the same category – Nina Dobrev – 6 (Choice Sci-Fi/Fantasy TV Actress)

Nominations
 Most nominations overall – Taylor Swift, tied with Selena Gomez – 61 – (Gomez has 54 individually, 7 with Selena Gomez & the Scene)
 Most nominations by an individual – Taylor Swift – 61 
 Most nominations by a television series – The Vampire Diaries – 67
 Most nominations by a film series – The Twilight Saga – 59 (Twilight, New Moon, Eclipse, Breaking Dawn – Part 1, Breaking Dawn – Part 2)
 Most nominations by a film – The Twilight Saga: Eclipse – 16
 Most consecutive nominations in the same category – Taylor Swift – 8 (Choice Female Artist)
 Most nominations by an individual without a win – Mila Kunis – 17
 Most nominations by a television series without a win – Lost – 32

Do Something

In 2008, Dosomething.org sponsored The Do Something Award—which recognized young people. Nine nominees—who saw a problem in the world and then tackled it—each won $10,000 for their cause. The winner received $100,000. The Do Something Award (formerly the BR!CK Awards) is a program of Do Something, a New York-based non-profit that reaches about 11.5 million young people annually. The award was not presented in 2009. It was replaced with "Choice Celebrity Activist", which was won by Hayden Panettiere.

Controversy
On August 11, 2014, after losing his category, Vine star Cameron Dallas tweeted that the awards ceremony was "rigged", saying that he had been informed six days prior to the actual event that he had won the award, and the runners-up were told to still try to solicit votes from their followers, even though the results had already been decided. He also tweeted "So I found out that the Teen Choice Awards were rigged and used powerful internet people for marketing. I'm sad now. Television is stupid" before deleting the tweets, saying he "should have taken the high road", but he "didn't like the fact that [his fans] were being lied to". Soon after Dallas' initial tweets, fellow Viner Carter Reynolds stated that the Teen Choice Awards had "used everyone for promotion", using the hashtag "#TeensDontHaveAChoiceAwards", which soon began trending by fans who noticed the disclaimer at the end of the show saying that the producers reserved the right to choose the winners.

In earlier years of the show, the voting rules page stated "Teenasaurus Rox reserves the right to choose the winner from the top four vote generators".

In 2016, controversy started on Twitter when fans became upset when they found out that late pop singer Christina Grimmie won the award for Choice Web Star: Music but was not mentioned during the show. Many fans felt that the award show should have been dedicated to her memory or at least for a moment of recognition.

In 2017, controversy started again on Twitter when fans became upset that The Dolan Twins lost their category of Choice YouTuber to Jake Paul after being told that they had won and had gone backstage to get ready to accept their award. Fans on Twitter were also upset that Actress and Dancer Chloe Lukasiak lost her category, Choice Dancer, to Maddie Ziegler after having the most retweets and being the top trending account under 'Choice Dancer' on Twitter.

Notes

References

External links

 
American film awards
American television awards
American music awards
Awards established in 1999
Awards disestablished in 2019
1999 establishments in the United States
Fox television specials
2019 disestablishments in the United States